Gustaf Vasa Church is a church located in the Vasastaden district of Stockholm, Sweden. Inaugurated in 1906 and named after 16th century King Gustav Vasa, it was designed by architect Agi Lindegren in the Baroque Revival style. The floor plan is in the shape of a Greek cross and seats 1,200 people, making it one of the largest churches in Stockholm.

Interior

It is Sweden's largest sculptural work in the Baroque style, originally created for the Uppsala Cathedral. Stored away at the Skansen museum for several years, it finally ended up at the Gustaf Vasa Church in 1906.

The interior of the dome was painted by Viktor Andren, and features an interpretation of the Transfiguration of Jesus. The church also has several other frescoes done by the same artist, depicting the Four Evangelists, the Baptism, the Last Supper, the Gospel and the Decalogue.

The church organ was built to the wishes of composer Otto Olsson, who was also the church organist 1907–1956. The organ has 76 voices spread over three manuals and pedals. The crypt beneath the church was originally used as a burial chapel, and was expanded in 1924 with what is most likely Sweden's first columbarium.

See also
 List of churches in Stockholm

References

External links 

 
 Panorama of the interior

20th-century Church of Sweden church buildings
Churches in the Diocese of Stockholm (Church of Sweden)
Baroque Revival architecture
Churches in Stockholm
Churches completed in 1906
Church buildings with domes
1906 establishments in Sweden
Gustav I of Sweden